Valerie Anne Sherrard (née Russell: born May 16, 1957) is a Canadian author of books for children and young adults including the novels The Glory Wind, Kate, Speechless and the Shelby Belgarden mystery series.

Early life
Sherrard was born in Moose Jaw, Saskatchewan to Bob and Pauline Russell and raised in Trenton, Ontario and Belleville, Ontario.  She has two brothers, Danny and Andrew.  When living in Lahr, West Germany, in the sixth-grade, her homeroom teacher, Alf Lower, inspired her to become a writer.

Career
The Glory Wind won the 2011 Geoffrey Bilson Award, the Ann Connor Brimer Award and was shortlisted for other awards, including the TD Canadian Children's Literature Award, and the Canadian Library Association Book of the Year for Children Award.

Sherrard's novel in free verse, Counting Back from Nine, was nominated for a 2013 Governor General's Award in the Children's Text category.

Sherrard's picture books include There's a Cow Under my Bed that was illustrated by Canadian Illustrator David Jardine and Miss Wondergem's Dreadfully Dreadful Pie that was illustrated by Canadian Illustrator Wendy J. Whittingham.

Sherrard's 2007 historical novel, Three Million Acres of Flame, is about the 1825 Miramichi Fire, the largest recorded land fire in North American history.

Personal life
Sherrard currently lives in Miramichi, New Brunswick, with her husband, Brent, who is also an author. Sherrard previously was the executive director of a group home for adolescents. While raising her own three children, Anthony, Rebecca (deceased) and Pamela, she was a foster parent to approximately seventy teenagers.

Selected works

Picture books

 There's a COW Under my Bed!, Tuckamore Books, 2008
 There's a GOLDFISH in My Shoe!, Tuckamore Books, 2009
 Miss Wondergem's Dreadfully Dreadful Pie, Tuckamore Books, 2011
 Down Here, Fitzhenry & Whiteside, 2015

Middle Grade and Young Adult novels

 Kate, Dundurn, 2003
 Sam's Light, Dundurn, 2004
 Sarah's Legacy, Dundurn, 2006
 Speechless, Dundurn, 2007
 Three Million Acres of Flame, Dundurn, 2007
 Watcher, Dundurn, 2009
 Tumbleweed Skies, Fitzhenry & Whiteside, 2009
 The Glory Wind, Fitzhenry & Whiteside, 2010
 Accomplice, Dundurn, 2011
 Testify, Dundurn, 2011
 Counting Back from Nine, Fitzhenry & Whiteside, 2012
 Driftwood, Fitzhenry & Whiteside, 2013
 Rain Shadow, Fitzhenry & Whiteside, 2014
 Random Acts, PenguinRandomHouse Canada, 2015
 The Rise and Fall of Derek Cowell, DCB, 2020
 Birdspell, DCB, 2021
 A Bend in the Breeze, DCB, 2022

The Shelby Belgarden Mysteries

 Out of the Ashes, Dundurn,      2002
 In Too Deep, Dundurn,          2003
 Chasing Shadows, Dundurn,      2004
 Hiding in Plain Sight, Dundurn, 2005
 Eyes of a Stalker, Dundurn,      2006
 Searching for Yesterday, Dundurn, 2008

References

Sources
"Valerie Sherrard" by The Writers' Union of Canada, June 16, 2006, retrieved June 16, 2006
"The Dundurn Group - Valerie Sherrard" by The Dundurn Group, May 8, 2012, retrieved May 8, 2012

1957 births
Living people
Canadian children's writers
People from Moose Jaw
Canadian expatriates in Germany
Canadian women children's writers
Canadian writers of young adult literature
Women writers of young adult literature